Safiou Salifou (born 11 August 1982) is a Togolese former professional footballer who played as a goalkeeper. He played in one match for the Togo national team in 2004. He was also named in Togo's squad for the 2002 African Cup of Nations tournament.

References

External links
 
 

1982 births
Living people
Togolese footballers
Association football goalkeepers
Togo international footballers
2002 African Cup of Nations players
ASKO Kara players
Dynamic Togolais players
21st-century Togolese people